The men's tournament of water polo at the 2019 Pan American Games in Lima, Peru will take place between 4 and 10 August at the Villa María del Triunfo cluster. The winner of the competition qualifies directly for the 2020 Summer Olympics in Tokyo, Japan, while the second through fourth-place finishing teams qualified for the 2020 Men's Water Polo Olympic Qualification Tournament.

Qualification
A total of eight men's teams and eight women's teams will qualify to compete at the games in each tournament. The host nation (Peru) qualified in each tournament, along with seven other teams in each tournament according to various criteria. Canada and the United States automatically qualified in each tournament, along with the top three teams at the 2018 Central American and Caribbean Games and top two teams at the 2018 South American Championships.

Format
Teams are split into 2 round-robin groups of 4 teams each, where the final positions in each group will determine seedings for the knockout stage. The losing teams from the quarterfinals stage will compete in a separate single elimination bracket to determine fifth through eighth places in the final rankings.

Preliminary round
All times are local (UTC−5).

Group A

Group B

Final stage

Bracket

Quarterfinals

5–8th place semifinals

Semifinals

Seventh place game

Fifth place game

Third place game

Final

Final standings

References

Men